Traditional Synthesizer Music is the twenty-second studio album by Canadian electronic musician Venetian Snares, announced December 17, 2015, and released February 19, 2016, on Planet Mu records. Unlike other albums by Venetian Snares, this album was composed and live recorded entirely on modular synthesizer equipment.

Critical reception 

At Metacritic, which assigns a weighted average score out of 100 to reviews from mainstream critics, Traditional Synthesizer Music received an average score of 76% based on 11 reviews, indicating "generally favorable reviews". AllMusic listed the album as one of their Favorite Electronic Albums of 2016, describing it as "a sharp, thrilling experience, and easily one of Funk's most focused works".

PopMatters placed it at number 52 on the "70 Best Albums of 2016" list.

Track listing

Charts

References

External links
 

2016 albums
Venetian Snares albums
Planet Mu albums